Brenda Joy Kaplan (born October 14, 1966), known by her stage name Brenda K. Starr, is an American singer and songwriter. She is well known originally in R&B, dance and pop but now mostly in salsa-based music. She is also well known for her 1980s work with freestyle music.

Early life
Starr was born as Brenda Joy Kaplan to a Jewish American father, organist Harvey Kaplan (also known as Harvey Kaye of the 1960s band the Spiral Starecase) and a Puerto Rican Roman Catholic mother.

Career
In the early 1980s, through a chance meeting with Harry Belafonte, Starr landed a role in his 1984 hip hop film, Beat Street; she appeared in it, as herself, as a singer at an open-microphone audition. Starr's appearance in the movie garnered attention, leading to a recording contract on Mirage Records, through Arthur Baker, who enlisted the help of two production teams (Lotti Golden and Richard Scher, and Carl Sturken and Evan Rogers) to complete Starr's debut album, I Want Your Love. The lead single, "Pickin' Up Pieces", written by Arthur Baker and Lotti Golden, was a local club sensation and national hit, peaking at No. 9 on the Billboard Hot Dance Club Play Charts and on the Dance Singles Sales Chart. "Pickin' Up Pieces" also peaked at No. 83 on the R&B Hip Hop Billboard Charts.

Starr's eponymous sophomore LP, which she released in 1987 on the MCA Records label before it became part of the present-day Universal Music Group, included what is considered her signature song, the power ballad "I Still Believe," which peaked at No. 13 on the U.S. Billboard Hot 100, becoming Starr's first and only top 20 single on the Hot 100. In 1998, Mariah Carey covered the song as a tribute to her "mentrix;" Carey's version peaked at No. 4 on the Billboard Hot 100 and was certified platinum by the RIAA. The album peaked at No. 58 on the Billboard 200 albums chart. Starr's other top 40 hit on the Billboard Hot 100 was "What You See Is What You Get" (which peaked at No. 24 and at No. 6 on the Hot Dance Music/Club Play).

Two of Starr's songs have been included on motion-picture soundtracks; "Sweet Surrender" was included in the soundtrack for the 1988 teen film License to Drive, starring Corey Haim, and "Sata" was on the soundtrack for the 1990 film Lambada. During the late 1980s, Mariah Carey sang background vocals for Starr, and Starr helped Carey secure a recording contract by giving a demo tape of hers to Columbia Records executive Tommy Mottola at a party. After being dropped from Sony/Columbia Records for lackluster sales of her third album, By Heart, Starr worked odd jobs to support herself and her family.

Starr learned Spanish to help rejuvenate her career, successfully reinventing herself as a salsa/tropical and Latin pop artist. After the release of her cover of "Herida" (from the Chilean singer Myriam Hernández), which peaked at No. 14 on the Latin Pop Airplay and at No. 1 on the Latin Tropical/Salsa Airplay chart, she continued her success with a string of popular albums and chart hits.

Starr was also a disc jockey at MIX 102.7, WNEW-FM, where she presented a request program titled "Under the Stars" from 9 pm to midnight on Sunday nights before the station changed formats. The lead single from her seventh album, Atrevete a Olvidarme, titled "Tu Eres," earned her a nomination from the Billboard Latin Music Awards in 2006.

Personal life
Starr is married to Chris Petrone and has 3 daughters and a son. Her 2 daughters Kayla Festa and Tori Festa are from a previous relationship with Brazilian-born New Jersey native, Joao (John) Festa. She has one child with her current husband, Chris Petrone Jr., named Gianna Isabella. Gianna made it to the top 10 of American Idol in its 15th and final season on the FOX broadcast network in 2016.

Awards and recognitions
 1997: Lo Nuestro Awards: Nominated: Tropical/Salsa Female Artist of the Year.
 2002: Latin Grammy Awards: Nominated: "Best Salsa Album: for Temptation.
 2002: Latin Grammy Awards: Nominated: "Best Salsa Single" for "Por Ese Hombre".
 2006: Billboard Latin Music Awards: Nominated: "Best Salsa Single" for "Tu Eres".

Discography

Albums

Singles

1980s

1990s

2000s

2010s

2020s

See also

List of Puerto Ricans
Jewish immigration to Puerto Rico

References

External links
Brenda K. Starr on MySpace

Brenda – features hit song "I Still Believe"

1966 births
Living people
American women singer-songwriters
American house musicians
American musicians of Puerto Rican descent
American people of Italian descent
American freestyle musicians
Jewish American musicians
Singers from New York City
American salsa musicians
American women pop singers
Spanish-language singers of the United States
Hispanic and Latino American women singers
21st-century American Jews
Women in Latin music
Singer-songwriters from New York (state)
21st-century American women